Cycnoches stelliferum is a species of orchid.

References 

stelliferum